Calzedonia is an Italian fashion group founded in Verona by Sandro Veronesi in 1986, with over 5,000 shops worldwide as of 2021. Besides the Calzedonia brand, the group also owns the Intimissimi, Tezenis, Falconeri, Atelier Emé,  Progetto Quid and SignorVino labels. The Calzedonia brand is specialized in bathing suits, tights, and leggings.  Veronesi's son, Marcello Veronesi, is the US CEO.

See also

 List of Italian companies

References

External links
 
 

Clothing brands of Italy
Clothing companies established in 1986
Italian companies established in 1986
Companies based in Verona
Lingerie brands
Underwear brands
Fashion accessory brands
Swimwear manufacturers